Choate House is a historic home located at Randallstown, Baltimore County, Maryland.  It is a -story gable-roofed stone building built in 1810, with a porch and dormers added in the 1880s.  The Italianate style was probably applied in the 1880s and include a full-length porch.

It was listed on the National Register of Historic Places in 1989.

References

External links
, including photo from 1989, at Maryland Historical Trust

Houses in Baltimore County, Maryland
Houses on the National Register of Historic Places in Maryland
Houses completed in 1810
Federal architecture in Maryland
Italianate architecture in Maryland
Randallstown, Maryland
National Register of Historic Places in Baltimore County, Maryland